Harka Bahadur Singh is a Nepalese politician, belonging to the CPN (Unified Socialist). In the 2008 Constituent Assembly election he was elected from the Doti-1 constituency, winning 14,506 votes.

References

Living people
Communist Party of Nepal (Unified Socialist) politicians
Year of birth missing (living people)

Members of the 1st Nepalese Constituent Assembly